Serlo le Mercer was Mayor of London for five terms in the early 1210s. He was a member of the Worshipful Company of Mercers and was one of the negotiators of Magna Carta.

See also
List of Lord Mayors of London

References

External links 
http://www.britsattheirbest.com/archives/002069.php

13th-century mayors of London
Year of birth missing
Year of death missing